PS Scotia was a steam paddle passenger vessel that ran between England and Ireland from 1847 to 1861, and then became an American Civil War blockade runner.

History

She was built by Money Wigram & Sons at Blackwall Yard, London in 1847 for the Chester & Holyhead Railway Company for a passenger service between Holyhead and Kingstown (Dún Laoghaire) and Howth.

From 1858 to 1859 she was loaned to the Scilly Isles Steam Navigation Company until their new ship the Little Western was ready.

She was transferred in 1859 to the London & North Western Railway Company. At Liverpool in December 1861, she was sold as a blockade runner and she made four runs and on the fifth attempting to reach Charleston she was captured by the Federals on 24 October 1862 at Bull's Bay, South Carolina.

By 23 January 1863, she had been sold and was registered at New York as General Banks. By then end of 1863 she had again been sold a number of times and ended up registered at Nassau as Fanny and Jenny.

She made two more runs against the Blockade but was driven ashore by the USS Florida on Wrightsville Beach, Masonboro Inlet, North Carolina on 10 February 1864.

References

	

1847 ships
Passenger ships of the United Kingdom
Steamships
Ships of the London and North Western Railway
Transport in the Isles of Scilly
Blockade runners of the Confederate States Navy
Shipwrecks of the American Civil War
Paddle steamers of the United Kingdom